The Permanent Mission of the Russian Federation to the United Nations in New York (Постоянное представительство Российской Федерации при ООН в г. Нью-Йорк) is a diplomatic mission of the Russian Federation to the United Nations with headquarters in New York.

Russia's Permanent Representative to the United Nations sits on the United Nations Security Council, where he has the right of veto.

History
In 1948–1964, the representative office was located in Percy R. Pyne House from 1911 (designed by McKim, Mead & White) at 680, Park Avenue, previously occupied by the Chinese representation to the United Nations (1947-1948). In 1960, Nikita Khrushchev spoke from the balcony of the building (mainly for press representatives). From 1964, it is housed in a 13-story building from 1961 at 136, East 67 Street. As a sub-tenant, the building also has a Permanent Representation of Belarus. The representative office also includes a residential estate with a 20-storey building from 1974 on Riverdale at West 255th Street 355 (along with 240 apartments, a high school, a polyclinic, a sports hall, a swimming pool, a duty-free shop, a showroom and a ballroom, an underground garage for 100 cars), two properties on Long Island, purchased in 1952 by the Russians Elmcroft estate from 1918 in Oyster Bay (38 rooms) and purchased in 1951 a Killenworth in the Tudor style property (designed by Trowbridge and Ackerman) from 1912 at Dosoris Lane in Glen Cove (49 rooms). The first served as the residence of Vyacheslav Molotov, while the second served as Nikita Khrushchev (in 1960 and 1963), as well as Fidel Castro.

Permanent Representatives

Gallery

See also
 Russia and the United Nations
 Russia–United States relations
 Soviet Union–United States relations
 Embassy of Russia, Washington, D.C.
 Consulate-General of Russia in New York City
 Russian Mission School in New York

External links
  The Permanent Mission of the Russian Federation to the United Nations in New York

References

Russia
1948 establishments in New York City
United Nations
Russia
Soviet Union and the United Nations
Russia and the United Nations
Soviet Union–United States relations
Russia–United States relations